Vadim Petrovich Kuzmin (March 19, 1964, Novosibirsk – November 19, 2012, Voronezh) was a Russian musician, the leader of rock-band Chyorniy Lukich. 

He started his musical activities in 1986 when founded the rock band "Spinki menta". The band became a member of Novosibirsk rock-club and participated in the First Novosibirsk Rock-Festival. He was in contact with other leaders of rock movement, Yanka Dyagileva and Yegor Letov. In 1988 he recorded his first albums in Omsk. In 1990 Kuzmin's band became the band of the Year in Novosibirsk.

Since 2006 Kuzmin with his family lived in Voronezh.

References

External links 
 official site
 Светлый Лукич: Памяти Вадима Кузьмина (воспоминания)

Russian rock musicians
Musicians from Novosibirsk
1964 births
2012 deaths